Jeanne Madden (born Jeanne Ethel Madden; November 10, 1917 – January 15, 1989), was an American singer known for her roles in musical theatre. She also appeared in a handful of films.

Filmography
 Stage Struck (1936)
 Sea Racketeers (1937)
 Talent Scout (1937)

References

Bibliography
 Thomas S. Hischak. The Oxford Companion to the American Musical: Theatre, Film, and Television. Oxford University Press, 2008.

External links

1917 births
1989 deaths
American film actresses
American stage actresses
Actors from Scranton, Pennsylvania
20th-century American singers
Musicians from Scranton, Pennsylvania
20th-century American actresses